This is a list of Swedish television related events from 1991.

Events
4 May - Sweden wins the 36th Eurovision Song Contest in Rome, Italy. The winning song is "Fångad av en stormvind", performed by Carola.

Debuts

Television shows
1–24 December - Sunes jul

Ending this year

Births

Deaths

See also
1991 in Sweden

References